Irene Iacopi is an Italian archaeologist.

In January 2007, Iacopi announced that she had probably found the legendary cave of Lupercal beneath the remains of the House of Augustus, the Domus Livia, on the Palatine Hill, believed by ancient Romans to be the cave where the twin boys Romulus and Remus were suckled by a she-wolf. Andrea Carandini, a professor of archaeology specialising in ancient Rome, described it as "one of the most important discoveries of all time".

Selected publications
 L'Antiquarium forense (Itinerari dei musei, gallerie e monumenti d'Italia) Istituto Poligrafico dello Stato (1974)
 Gli scavi sul colle Palatino: Testimonianze e documenti Electa (1997) 
 La decorazione pittorica dell'aula isiaca  Electa (1997) 
 Domus Aurea Electa (1999) 
 The House of Augustus: Wall Paintings Electa (2008)

References

Living people
Italian archaeologists
Italian women archaeologists
20th-century archaeologists
20th-century Italian women writers
Year of birth missing (living people)
20th-century Italian non-fiction writers
21st-century archaeologists
21st-century Italian women writers
21st-century Italian non-fiction writers
Italian women non-fiction writers